Hristo Dimitrov (born 16 November 1968) is a Bulgarian wrestler. He competed in the men's Greco-Roman 90 kg at the 1996 Summer Olympics.

References

1968 births
Living people
Bulgarian male sport wrestlers
Olympic wrestlers of Bulgaria
Wrestlers at the 1996 Summer Olympics
People from Lovech